Antoine Henri Becquerel (15 December 1852 – 25 August 1908) was a French engineer, physicist, Nobel laureate, and the first person to discover evidence of radioactivity. For work in this field he, along with Marie Skłodowska-Curie and Pierre Curie,  received the 1903 Nobel Prize in Physics. The SI unit for radioactivity, the becquerel (Bq), is named after him.

Biography

Early life
Becquerel was born in Paris, France, into a wealthy family which produced four generations of physicists: Becquerel's grandfather (Antoine César Becquerel), father (Alexandre-Edmond Becquerel), and son (Jean Becquerel). Henri started off his education by attending the Lycée Louis-le-Grand school, a prep school in Paris. He studied engineering at the École Polytechnique and the École des Ponts et Chaussées. In 1874, Henri married Lucie Zoé Marie Jamin, who would die while giving birth to their son, Jean. In 1890 he married Louise Désirée Lorieux.

Career
In Becquerel's early career, he became the third in his family to occupy the physics chair at the Muséum National d'Histoire Naturelle in 1892. Later on in 1894, Becquerel became chief engineer in the Department of Bridges and Highways before he started with his early experiments. Becquerel's earliest works centered on the subject of his doctoral thesis: the plane polarization of light, with the phenomenon of phosphorescence and absorption of light by crystals. Early in his career, Becquerel also studied the Earth's magnetic fields.

Becquerel's discovery of spontaneous radioactivity is a famous example of serendipity, of how chance favors the prepared mind. Becquerel had long been interested in phosphorescence, the emission of light of one color following a body's exposure to light of another color. In early 1896, there was a wave of excitement following Wilhelm Conrad Röntgen's discovery of X-rays on 5 January. During the experiment, Röntgen "found that the Crookes tubes he had been using to study cathode rays emitted a new kind of invisible ray that was capable of penetrating through black paper". Learning of Röntgen's discovery from earlier that year during a meeting of the French Academy of Sciences caused Becquerel to be interested, and soon "began looking for a connection between the phosphorescence he had already been investigating and the newly discovered x-rays" of Röntgen, and thought that phosphorescent materials, such as some uranium salts, might emit penetrating X-ray-like radiation when illuminated by bright sunlight.`

By May 1896, after other experiments involving non-phosphorescent uranium salts, he arrived at the correct explanation, namely that the penetrating radiation came from the uranium itself, without any need for excitation by an external energy source. There followed a period of intense research into radioactivity, including the determination that the element thorium is also radioactive and the discovery of additional radioactive elements polonium and radium by Marie Skłodowska-Curie and her husband Pierre Curie. The intensive research of radioactivity led to Becquerel publishing seven papers on the subject in 1896. Becquerel's other experiments allowed him to research more into radioactivity and figure out different aspects of the magnetic field when radiation is introduced into the magnetic field. "When different radioactive substances were put in the magnetic field, they deflected in different directions or not at all, showing that there were three classes of radioactivity: negative, positive, and electrically neutral."

As often happens in science, radioactivity came close to being discovered nearly four decades earlier in 1857, when Abel Niépce de Saint-Victor, who was investigating photography under Michel Eugène Chevreul, observed that uranium salts emitted radiation that could darken photographic emulsions. By 1861, Niepce de Saint-Victor realized that uranium salts produce "a radiation that is invisible to our eyes". Niepce de Saint-Victor knew Edmond Becquerel, Henri Becquerel's father.  In 1868, Edmond Becquerel published a book, La lumière: ses causes et ses effets (Light:  Its causes and its effects).  On page 50 of volume 2, Edmond noted that Niepce de Saint-Victor had observed that some objects that had been exposed to sunlight could expose photographic plates even in the dark. Niepce further noted that on the one hand, the effect was diminished if an obstruction were placed between a photographic plate and the object that had been exposed to the sun, but " … d'un autre côté, l'augmentation d'effet quand la surface insolée est couverte de substances facilement altérables à la lumière, comme le nitrate d'urane … " ( ... on the other hand, the increase in the effect when the surface exposed to the sun is covered with substances that are easily altered by light, such as uranium nitrate ... ).

Experiments 
Describing them to the French Academy of Sciences on 27 February 1896, he said:
One wraps a Lumière photographic plate with a bromide emulsion in two sheets of very thick black paper, such that the plate does not become clouded upon being exposed to the sun for a day. One places on the sheet of paper, on the outside, a slab of the phosphorescent substance, and one exposes the whole to the sun for several hours. When one then develops the photographic plate, one recognizes that the silhouette of the phosphorescent substance appears in black on the negative. If one places between the phosphorescent substance and the paper a piece of money or a metal screen pierced with a cut-out design, one sees the image of these objects appear on the negative ... One must conclude from these experiments that the phosphorescent substance in question emits rays which pass through the opaque paper and reduce silver salts.Comptes Rendus 122: 420 (1896), translated by Carmen Giunta. Accessed 02 March 2019.

But further experiments led him to doubt and then abandon this hypothesis. On 2 March 1896 he reported:
I will insist particularly upon the following fact, which seems to me quite important and beyond the phenomena which one could expect to observe: The same crystalline crusts [of potassium uranyl sulfate], arranged the same way with respect to the photographic plates, in the same conditions and through the same screens, but sheltered from the excitation of incident rays and kept in darkness, still produce the same photographic images. Here is how I was led to make this observation: among the preceding experiments, some had been prepared on Wednesday the 26th and Thursday the 27th of February, and since the sun was out only intermittently on these days, I kept the apparatuses prepared and returned the cases to the darkness of a bureau drawer, leaving in place the crusts of the uranium salt. Since the sun did not come out in the following days, I developed the photographic plates on the 1st of March, expecting to find the images very weak. Instead the silhouettes appeared with great intensity ... One hypothesis which presents itself to the mind naturally enough would be to suppose that these rays, whose effects have a great similarity to the effects produced by the rays studied by M. Lenard and M. Röntgen, are invisible rays emitted by phosphorescence and persisting infinitely longer than the duration of the luminous rays emitted by these bodies. However, the present experiments, without being contrary to this hypothesis, do not warrant this conclusion. I hope that the experiments which I am pursuing at the moment will be able to bring some clarification to this new class of phenomena.Comptes Rendus 122: 501–503 (1896), translated by Carmen Giunta. Accessed 02 March 2019.

Late career
Later in his life in 1900, Becquerel measured the properties of Beta Particles, and he realized that they had the same measurements as high speed electrons leaving the nucleus.  In 1901 Becquerel made the discovery that radioactivity could be used for medicine. Henri made this discovery when he left a piece of radium in his vest pocket and noticed that he had been burnt by it. This discovery led to the development of radiotherapy which is now used to treat cancer. Becquerel did not survive much longer after his discovery of radioactivity and died on 25 August 1908, at the age of 55, in Le Croisic, France. His death was from unknown causes, but was reported that "he had developed serious burns on his skin, likely from the handling of radioactive materials."

Honors and awards

In 1889, Becquerel became a member of the Académie des Sciences. In 1900, Becquerel won the Rumford Medal for his discovery of the radioactivity of uranium and he was made an Officer of the Legion of Honour. The Berlin-Brandenburg Academy of Sciences and Humanities awarded him the Helmholtz Medal in 1901. In 1902, he was elected as a member of the American Philosophical Society. In 1903, Henri shared a Nobel Prize in Physics with Pierre Curie and Marie Curie for the discovery of spontaneous radioactivity. In 1905, he was awarded the Barnard Medal by the U.S. National Academy of Sciences. In 1906, Henri was elected Vice Chairman of the academy, and in 1908, the year of his death, Becquerel was elected Permanent Secretary of the Académie des Sciences. During his lifetime, Becquerel was honored with membership into the Accademia dei Lincei and the Royal Academy of Berlin. Becquerel was elected a Foreign Member of the Royal Society (ForMemRS) in 1908. Becquerel has been honored with being the namesake of many different scientific discoveries. The SI unit for radioactivity, the becquerel (Bq), is named after him.

There is a crater named Becquerel on the Moon and also a crater named Becquerel on Mars. The uranium-based mineral becquerelite was named after Henri.
Minor planet 6914 Becquerel is named in his honor.

See also
 Antoine César Becquerel (his grandfather)
 A. E. Becquerel (his father)
 Jean Becquerel (his son)
 Becquerelite (mineral)
 Becquerel (SI unit)

References

External links

  including the Nobel Lecture, 11 December 1903 On Radioactivity, a New Property of Matter
 Becquerel short biography  and the use of his name as a unit of measure in the SI
 Annotated bibliography for Henri Becquerel from the Alsos Digital Library for Nuclear Issues
 Henri Becquerel, SI-derived unit of radioactivity
 "Henri Becquerel: The Discovery of Radioactivity", Becquerel's 1896 articles online and analyzed on BibNum [click 'à télécharger' for English version].
 
 

1852 births
1908 deaths
20th-century French physicists
École Polytechnique alumni
École des Ponts ParisTech alumni
Corps des ponts
Scientists from Paris
Experimental physicists
Nobel laureates in Physics
Radioactivity
French Nobel laureates
French nuclear physicists
Members of the French Academy of Sciences
Foreign associates of the National Academy of Sciences
Foreign Members of the Royal Society
Nuclear history of France
Members of the American Philosophical Society
Presidents of the Société Française de Physique